Babacar is the only album by the British rock group Babacar.

Critical reception
Allmusic reviewer Ajda Snyder calls it "patient and breezy, with mostly clean guitar sounds" and the songs "on the whole, pleasant and trippy." Snyder wrote that singer Caroline Crawley possessed "a very unique and recognizable voice. The subject matter of her lyrics includes all things natural, such as landscapes and fauna, and she sings softly but firmly with a thoughtless confidence."

Track listing

Personnel 

Babacar
Caroline Crawley - vocals
Roberto Soave	- bass guitar
Rob Steen - guitar
Boris Williams - drums

Additional personnel
Bruno Ellingham - violin
Tristan Powell - e-bow
Porl Thompson - guitar, banjo
Hebe Lucraft - artwork

References

1998 debut albums
Babacar (band) albums